Shahen is a given name and surname. It may refer to:

Given name
Shahen (Sassanian general) or Shahin Vahmanzadegan (died ca. 626), senior Sasanian general (spahbed) during the reign of Khosrau II 
Shahen Khachatrian (born 1934), Armenian art expert
Shahen Meghrian (1952–1993), Armenian military commander and political activist
Shahen Nikolay Petrosyan (1912–1999), Armenian lawyer, doctor of law, professor in Soviet Armenia

Surname
Yenovk Shahen (1881–1915), Ottoman Armenian actor and director

See also
Shahan (disambiguation)
Shahin (disambiguation), including Shaheen